Alondra  is a Mexican telenovela produced by Carla Estrada for Televisa in 1995. The story based on Casandra created by Yolanda Vargas Dulché. For personal reasons Yolanda Vargas Dulché changed the name of Casandra to Alondra in honor of her granddaughter Alondra de la Parra. It stars Ana Colchero, Ernesto Laguardia and Gonzalo Vega.

Plot 
After the death of Alondra's mother, her father Baldomero, who feels sad and lonely, brings his sister Loreta and her two kids, Maria Elisa and Rigoberto to live in his house, hoping that Loreta will replace a mother to Alondra. But he is mistaken. Loreta hates Alondra, as she reminds her of Alondra's mother who used to be an actress and whom Baldomero's family never accepted. Years go by, and Alondra grows up into a beautiful, rebellious girl, with very independent and progressive views for that time.

Her constant fights with Loreta continue, but now she learned how to fight back. In the meantime, Baldomero spends most of the time on his ranch in arms of his new love Carmelina, unaware of what's going on in his house. Loreta manages to make Alondra's life a living hell, including her own daughter's, Maria Elisa, a shy and weak girl.

While Loreta tries to force her into a marrying a rich old man, Maria Elisa is in love with Raul, a young officer. To make matters worse, Loreta's evil and ambitious son, Rigoberto, gets kicked out of a seminary and returns home, also torturing Alondra and Maria Elisa. Alondra meets a retired and famous singer, Leticia del Bosque, whom influences and advises Alondra and suggests that she goes to the ranch and tells everything to Baldomero.
On Alondra's way to the ranch, she accidentally meets Bruno. They live a very passionate love, but she later discovers that he is married and has two children. Further more, on the ranch she finds out that her father is going to re-marry for the second time. Disappointed she returns home, where she finds that Maria Elisa is also upset, as she is pregnant and believes that Raul has abandoned her.

The two girls decide to go to Mexico City in search for a better life, success and new love. And it is in Mexico City that Alondra, who has started a flower business, meets Carlos. But her forbidden love for Bruno is not over yet.

Cast 
 
Ana Colchero as Alondra Díaz del Real
Ernesto Laguardia as Carlos Támez
Gonzalo Vega as Bruno Leblanc
Beatriz Sheridan as Loreto Díaz Vda. de Escobar
Marga López as Leticia del Bosque
Eric del Castillo as Baldomero Díaz
Héctor Gómez as Father Gervacio
Verónica Merchant as María Elisa Escobar Díaz
Beatriz Aguirre as Rosita
Amparo Arozamena as Matilde "Maty" Ruiz
Juan Manuel Bernal as Rigoberto Escobar
Fernando Colunga as Tte. Raúl Gutiérrez
Olivia Bucio as Carmelina Hernández de Díaz
Emoé de la Parra as Cristina Leblanc
Gustavo Ganem as Ramiro Estrada
Silvia Mariscal as Mercedes Vda. de Támez
Blanca Torres as Barbarita
Diana Bracho as Alondra (voice)
Queta Carrasco as Rosario
Dina de Marco as Trini Gómez
Ernesto Godoy as Robertito Hurtado
Queta Lavat as Concepción Hurtado
Justo Martínez as Jorge
Aurora Molina as Rita
Mónika Sánchez as Enriqueta
Guillermo Murray as Lic. Pelegrín Casasola
Bertín Osborne as Captain Andrés Kloszt
Angelina Peláez as Librada Perez Aguayo
Tina Romero as Cecilia
Anahí as Margarita Leblanc
Yuliana Peniche as Alondra (child)
Katie Barberi as Rebecca Montes de Oca
Joel Núñez as Germán Aguirre
Omar Gutiérrez as Javier Leblanc
Rodolfo Vélez as Don Pablo Miranda
Bertha Moss as Sofía Lascurain
Jorge Alberto Bolaños as Miguel
Gabriela Murray as Antonieta "Teta" Gomez
Jorge Martínez de Hoyos as Alfredito
Mauricio Achar as Jesús "Chucho" Aguirre
Consuelo Duval as Blanqita de Aguirre
Irene Arcila as Jovita
Nerina Ferrer as Gloria de Casasola
Sergio Klainer as Lic. Gonzalo Rios
Alejandro Villeli as Jacinto Alatorre
Luis Couturier as Leticia's notary
Jacqueline Andere as Verónica del Real de Díaz
Lourdes Deschamps as Celia
Teo Tapia as Lic. Ortigoza
Roxana Ramos  as Berthita "Tita" Gómez
José Antonio Barón as Mario
Guillermo Aguilar as Luis
Valentina García as María Elisa Escobar Díaz (child)
Isaac Edid as Rigoberto Escobar Díaz (child)
Maritza Aldana as María
Alfredo Alfonso as Leopoldo
Dulcina Carballo as Rufina
Rafael de Quevedo as Ordóñez
José Antonio Ferral as El Tejón
Arturo Guízar as Joaquín
Lucía Irurita as Eduviges
Rodolfo Lago as Francisco
Willebaldo López as Martínez
Arturo Lorca as Pancho
Ximena Sariñana as Pilarica
Juan Antonio Llanes as Tolemán
Carlos Osiris as Mireles
Benjamín Pineda as José
Soledad Ruiz as Genoveva
Víctor Zeuz as Daniel
Martín Rojas as Marcos
Fabiola Stevenson as Lucía
Sebastián Garza as Rolando Acuña
Arturo Paulet as Octavio Bertolini
Luis Robles as Celestino
Genoveva Pérez as Petra
Gustavo del Castillo as Pedro
Catalina López as Carlotta "Tota" Gómez
Alberto Larrazabal as Ramón Hanhausen
Zoila Quiñones as Florist Lady
Luis Bayardo as Father
Julio Monterde as Doctor
Dulce María as Child in the church

Awards

International Broadcasters of Alondra 
North & South America, Caribbean
 
 
 
 
 
 
 
 
 
 
 
 
 
 
 
 
 

Europe, Asia & Oceania

References

External links

1995 telenovelas
Female characters in comics
Mexican telenovelas
1995 Mexican television series debuts
1995 Mexican television series endings
Spanish-language telenovelas
Television shows set in Mexico
Televisa telenovelas
Television shows based on comics